HLW may refer to:
 HLW International, an American architectural and engineering firm
 Hart Legacy Wrestling
 High-level waste
 Hillington West railway station, in Glasgow, Scotland
 Hluhluwe Airport, in KwaZulu-Natal, South Africa